Eilema lutarella is a moth of the family Erebidae. It is found in North Africa through Central Europe up to the area surrounding the Amur River and Sakhalin. In the north, it is found up to Scandinavia, Komi Republic in European Russia, Vitim river in Siberia.

The wingspan is 27–30 mm. The moth flies from July to August depending on the location.

The larvae feed on lichen.

Subspecies
Eilema lutarella lutarella
Eilema lutarella luqueti (Leraut, 2006) (France)

References

External links
Eilema lutarella on Fauna Europaea
Eilema lutarella on Lepiforum e.V.
Eilema lutarella on De Vlinderstichting 
Eilema lutarellum on Naturhistoriska Riksmuseet 

Lithosiina
Moths described in 1758
Moths of Europe
Moths of Asia
Taxa named by Carl Linnaeus